The 1959 Pacific Tigers football team represented the College of the Pacific during the 1959 NCAA University Division football season.

Pacific competed as an independent in 1959. They played home games in Pacific Memorial Stadium in Stockton, California. In their seventh season under head coach Jack Myers, the Tigers finished with a record of five wins and four losses (5–4). For the season they outscored their opponents 132–117.

Schedule

Team players in the AFL/NFL
The following College of the Pacific players were selected in the 1960 NFL Draft.

The following College of the Pacific players were selected in the 1960 AFL Draft.

The following finished their college career at Pacific, were not drafted, but played in the inaugural season of the AFL.

Notes

References

Pacific
Pacific Tigers football seasons
Pacific Tigers football